The Jonathan Winters Show is the first of two American television network Variety show television programs to be hosted by comedian Jonathan Winters. The television series was broadcast from October 1956 to June 1957 on NBC.

Synopsis
This Jonathan Winters Show was aired at the beginning of prime time, from 7:30 to 7:45 PM Eastern time on Tuesday nights, to round out the half-hour containing NBC's evening newscast, which was at the time, like all similar programs, likewise only 15 minutes long.  This program replaced the Tuesday night broadcast of The Dinah Shore Show, which, since 1951, was broadcast on both Tuesday and Thursday nights and reduced in October 1956 to Thursday nights only.   Although network evening newscasts were not expanded to a half hour until 1963, the 1956-57 season was the last one in which the American networks aired 15 minute long entertainment programs to complete filling the time slot. This series  holds the distinction of being the first television program to use videotape. A song performed by Your Hit Parade regular Dorothy Collins introduced the new format on October 23, 1956.  Winters' show was also one of the first weekly series to broadcast In color.

Format
This early Jonathan Winters Show consisted of an opening monologue by Winters, a musical number by a guest star, and a closing comedy sketch by Winters, which might also include the guest star.

Cast
In addition to host Winters, announcer Don Pardo was also on the program through March 1957, frequently appearing with Winters in the sketches also.  In that month, he was replaced by Wayne Howell in this role.  Regular musical support was provided by the Eddie Safranski Orchestra.

References
 Brooks, Tim and Marsh, Earle, The Complete Directory to Prime Time Network and Cable TV Shows

External links
  
 Two public domain episodes at the Internet Archive

1956 American television series debuts
1957 American television series endings
NBC original programming
1950s American sketch comedy television series
1950s American variety television series
Black-and-white American television shows
English-language television shows